The 2020 Just World Indoor Bowls Championship was held at Potters Leisure Resort, Hopton-on-Sea, Great Yarmouth, England, from 9–26 January 2020. The event was organised by the World Bowls Tour and televised by the BBC.

In the Open Singles, all 16 seeds progressed to round two, which last happened in 2009 but the top four seeds failed to make the semi final stage. Nick Brett progressed to the final and was attempting to become the first player in the history of the competition to achieve the treble of open singles, open pairs and mixed pairs during the same year. His opponent Robert Paxton (in his third career open singles final) started well in the first set before Brett took control of the set, winning it 10–7. Paxton deservedly took the second set 8-7 despite a late Brett comeback which forced the match into a tie break. The tie break went to the deciding end and Paxton's second bowl on the backhand was good enough to seal the title and deny Brett the treble.

In the Open Pairs, the third seeds Greg Harlow and Nick Brett won the title beating Paul Foster and Alex Marshall in the final which prevented the Scottish pair from winning another pairs event.

Julie Forrest successfully retained her women's crown by defeating Janice Gower in the final.

The mixed pairs saw Nick Brett win a second title and a fifth career world indoor success, he was partnered by Marion Purcell.

Winners

Draw and results

Open singles

Women's singles

Open pairs

Mixed pairs

Open Under 25

External links

References

World Indoor Bowls Championship
2020 in bowls
World Indoor Bowls Championship
International sports competitions hosted by England
World Indoor Bowls Championship
Sport in Great Yarmouth
World Indoor Bowls